The Braille pattern dots-136 is a 6-dot braille cell with the top left and both bottom dots raised, or an 8-dot braille cell with the top left and both lower-middle dots raised. It is represented by the Unicode code point U+2825, and in Braille ASCII with U.

Unified Braille

In unified international braille, the braille pattern dots-136 is used to represent a close back vowel, such as /u/ or /ɯ/ or otherwise as needed.

Table of unified braille values

Other braille

Plus dots 7 and 8

Related to Braille pattern dots-136 are Braille patterns 1367, 1368, and 13678, which are used in 8-dot braille systems, such as Gardner-Salinas and Luxembourgish Braille.

Related 8-dot kantenji patterns

In the Japanese kantenji braille, the standard 8-dot Braille patterns 278, 1278, 2478, and 12478 are the patterns related to Braille pattern dots-136, since the two additional dots of kantenji patterns 0136, 1367, and 01367 are placed above the base 6-dot cell, instead of below, as in standard 8-dot braille.

Kantenji using braille patterns 278, 1278, 2478, or 12478

This listing includes kantenji using Braille pattern dots-136 for all 6349 kanji found in JIS C 6226-1978.

  - 走

Variants and thematic compounds

  -  selector 6 + は/辶  =  尚
  -  は/辶 + selector 1  =  延
  -  は/辶 + selector 1 + selector 1  =  廴
  -  は/辶 + selector 2  =  支
  -  は/辶 + selector 3  =  遊
  -  は/辶 + selector 4  =  赱
  -  比 + は/辶  =  母
  -  selector 1 + 比 + は/辶  =  毋

Compounds of 走 and 辶

  -  ゆ/彳 + は/辶  =  徒
  -  は/辶 + と/戸  =  赴
  -  は/辶 + き/木  =  起
  -  は/辶 + ぬ/力  =  超
  -  は/辶 + ひ/辶  =  越
  -  は/辶 + ゑ/訁  =  趣
  -  は/辶 + す/発  =  趨
  -  は/辶 + 宿 + さ/阝  =  赳
  -  は/辶 + 宿 + う/宀/#3  =  趁
  -  は/辶 + そ/馬 + ⺼  =  趙
  -  み/耳 + 宿 + は/辶  =  跿
  -  は/辶 + か/金  =  巡
  -  は/辶 + や/疒  =  辿
  -  は/辶 + ろ/十  =  迅
  -  は/辶 + け/犬  =  迭
  -  は/辶 + に/氵  =  述
  -  は/辶 + そ/馬  =  逐
  -  は/辶 + つ/土  =  通
  -  き/木 + は/辶 + つ/土  =  樋
  -  は/辶 + く/艹  =  造
  -  る/忄 + は/辶 + く/艹  =  慥
  -  は/辶 + 宿  =  逸
  -  は/辶 + む/車  =  運
  -  は/辶 + ら/月  =  遣
  -  え/訁 + は/辶 + ら/月  =  譴
  -  か/金 + は/辶 + ら/月  =  鑓
  -  は/辶 + さ/阝  =  遷
  -  と/戸 + は/辶 + さ/阝  =  韆
  -  は/辶 + ま/石  =  邁
  -  は/辶 + 宿 + か/金  =  迂

Compounds of 尚

  -  氷/氵 + selector 6 + は/辶  =  敞
  -  よ/广 + selector 6 + は/辶  =  廠
  -  に/氵 + selector 6 + は/辶  =  淌

Compounds of 延 and 廴

  -  え/訁 + は/辶  =  誕
  -  か/金 + は/辶  =  鍵
  -  て/扌 + は/辶 + へ/⺩  =  挺
  -  き/木 + は/辶 + へ/⺩  =  梃
  -  ち/竹 + は/辶 + へ/⺩  =  霆
  -  は/辶 + む/車 + selector 1  =  蜑
  -  に/氵 + は/辶 + selector 1  =  涎
  -  ち/竹 + は/辶 + selector 1  =  筵
  -  く/艹 + は/辶 + selector 1  =  莚
  -  む/車 + は/辶 + selector 1  =  蜒
  -  は/辶 + へ/⺩  =  廷
  -  は/辶 + ふ/女  =  建
  -  ⺼ + は/辶 + ふ/女  =  腱
  -  は/辶 + れ/口  =  廻
  -  は/辶 + た/⽥ + selector 4  =  廸
  -  は/辶 + 比 + に/氵  =  廼

Compounds of 支

  -  ふ/女 + は/辶  =  妓
  -  や/疒 + は/辶  =  岐
  -  て/扌 + は/辶  =  技
  -  き/木 + は/辶  =  枝
  -  と/戸 + は/辶  =  鼓
  -  め/目 + は/辶  =  瞽
  -  と/戸 + と/戸 + は/辶  =  皷
  -  ⺼ + は/辶  =  肢
  -  み/耳 + は/辶 + selector 2  =  跂
  -  な/亻 + 宿 + は/辶  =  伎
  -  と/戸 + 宿 + は/辶  =  屐
  -  は/辶 + 比 + え/訁  =  敲
  -  は/辶 + む/車 + selector 2  =  翅

Compounds of 遊

  -  に/氵 + は/辶 + selector 3  =  游
  -  む/車 + は/辶 + selector 3  =  蝣

Compounds of 母 and 毋

  -  龸 + は/辶  =  毎
  -  な/亻 + は/辶  =  侮
  -  る/忄 + は/辶  =  悔
  -  日 + は/辶  =  晦
  -  心 + は/辶  =  梅
  -  に/氵 + は/辶  =  海
  -  つ/土 + に/氵 + は/辶  =  塰
  -  ゑ/訁 + は/辶  =  誨
  -  は/辶 + ゐ/幺  =  繁
  -  心 + 龸 + は/辶  =  莓
  -  ふ/女 + 比 + は/辶  =  姆
  -  て/扌 + 比 + は/辶  =  拇
  -  心 + 比 + は/辶  =  栂
  -  へ/⺩ + は/辶  =  毒
  -  ゐ/幺 + へ/⺩ + は/辶  =  纛
  -  ね/示 + 比 + は/辶  =  袰
  -  う/宀/#3 + う/宀/#3 + は/辶  =  實

Other compounds

  -  ろ/十 + は/辶  =  半
  -  仁/亻 + は/辶  =  伴
  -  ぬ/力 + は/辶  =  畔
  -  い/糹/#2 + は/辶  =  絆
  -  は/辶 + ね/示  =  判
  -  て/扌 + ろ/十 + は/辶  =  拌
  -  ⺼ + ろ/十 + は/辶  =  胖
  -  ね/示 + ろ/十 + は/辶  =  袢
  -  ら/月 + は/辶  =  朔
  -  つ/土 + は/辶  =  塑
  -  る/忄 + ら/月 + は/辶  =  愬
  -  き/木 + ら/月 + は/辶  =  槊
  -  に/氵 + ら/月 + は/辶  =  溯
  -  ひ/辶 + ら/月 + は/辶  =  遡
  -  ひ/辶 + は/辶  =  逆
  -  れ/口 + は/辶  =  只
  -  た/⽥ + れ/口 + は/辶  =  咫
  -  心 + れ/口 + は/辶  =  枳
  -  う/宀/#3 + は/辶  =  実
  -  け/犬 + は/辶  =  犯
  -  を/貝 + は/辶  =  貼
  -  は/辶 + ん/止  =  反
  -  に/氵 + は/辶 + ん/止  =  汳
  -  日 + は/辶 + ん/止  =  皈
  -  か/金 + は/辶 + ん/止  =  鈑
  -  は/辶 + い/糹/#2  =  拝
  -  は/辶 + は/辶 + い/糹/#2  =  拜
  -  に/氵 + は/辶 + い/糹/#2  =  湃
  -  て/扌 + 宿 + は/辶  =  搏
  -  氷/氵 + selector 3 + は/辶  =  敝
  -  日 + selector 3 + は/辶  =  暼
  -  心 + selector 6 + は/辶  =  棠
  -  心 + 宿 + は/辶  =  薑
  -  ね/示 + selector 6 + は/辶  =  裳

Notes

Braille patterns